Huairou Area, or Huairou Town, is an area and a town situated on the souther portion of Huairou District, Beijing, China. It borders Yanqi Town in the north, Beifang Town in the east, Yangsong and Miaocheng Towns in the south, Qiaozi and Bohai Towns in the west, and contains Quanhe and Longshan Subdistricts within. In 2020, its population was 41,990.

Its name Huairou came from Classic of Poetry, with the original meaning of "Solicit Comfort". It was first used as a name for this region during the Tang dynasty.

History

Administrative divisions 
In 2021, Huairou Area had direct jurisdiction over of 20 subdivisions, in which 2 were communities and 18 were villages:

Landmark 

 Hongluo Temple

Gallery

See also 

 List of township-level divisions of Beijing

References 

Huairou District
Towns in Beijing
Areas of Beijing